HMS Rosemary was an Arabis-class minesweeping sloop of the British Royal Navy. Built by the Teesside shipbuilder Richardson, Duck and Company from 1915–1916, Rosemary carried out minesweeping and anti submarine operations during the First World War. She was used for fishery protection duties during the 1930s, and served through the Second World War, finally being sold for scrap in 1947.

Design and construction
The Arabis class was a slightly enlarged and improved derivative of the previous  and  sloops. They were designed at the start of the First World War as relatively fast minesweepers that could also carry out various miscellaneous duties in support of the fleet such as acting as dispatch vessels or carrying out towing operations, but as the war continued and the threat from German submarines grew, became increasingly involved in anti-submarine duties.

Displacement was  normal. The Arabis class had a main armament of two 4.7-inch (120 mm) guns or two 4-inch (102 mm) guns, with two 3-pounder (47 mm) anti-aircraft guns also carried. By 1929, Rosemary was listed as having an armament of a single 4-inch gun and two 2-pounder "pom-pom" anti-aircraft guns.

Rosemary was part of the third batch of six Arabis-class sloops ordered by the British Admiralty on 27 July 1915. The ship was laid down by Richardson, Duck and Company as yard number 661, and launched at their Thornaby-on-Tees shipyard on 22 November 1915, and was accepted into service on 5 February 1916.

Service

First World War
After commissioning, Rosemary joined the 10th Sloop Flotilla, replacing sister ship , sunk in a clash with German torpedo boats on 10 February 1916. The flotilla, including Rosemary, carried out minesweeping operations in the North Sea on 19–21 to clear 'L channel', the route from the Firth of Forth to the North Sea, completing the sweeping operations that had been interrupted by the Germans on 10 February. On the morning of 4 July 1916, the 10th Sloop Flotilla was again carrying out sweeps of the routes to the German Bight used by the Grand Fleet. Rosemary reported sighting a submarine astern at 6:25am, but the commander of the flotilla paid little importance to the report and the sweeping operations continued. At 9:25am, the sloop , which was working with Rosemary, sighted two torpedoes which she avoided, but one of the torpedoes, which had been fired by the German submarine , hit Rosemary, blowing off Rosemarys stern. Rosemary was taken under tow by Alyssum and escorted back to the Humber by the rest of the flotilla. Three of Rosemarys crew were killed.

In February 1917, as a result of the German resumption of unrestricted submarine warfare, and the resulting heavy shipping losses in the Western Approaches, Rosemary, together with the rest of the 10th Sloop Flotilla, was transferred to Queenstown (now Cobh) in the South of Ireland, to be deployed on escort duties. By July that year, Rosemary had transferred to the Northern division of the Coast of Ireland Station, with headquarters at Buncrana. None of the escort spotted the submarine. On 12 December 1917, Rosemary was in collision with the destroyer , with Wolverine sinking as a result. Two of Wolverines crew were killed.

By June 1918, Rosemary had transferred to the Northern Patrol, and was listed as part of the 3rd Sloop Flotilla the next month. Rosemary remained part of the 3rd Sloop Flotilla, based at Dundee at the end of the war on 11 November 1918.

Between the wars
By December 1918, Rosemary had transferred to the 23rd Fleet Sweeping Flotilla, part of the Northern division of the Coast of Ireland Station, serving as Senior Officer's Ship. She was employed on post-war mine clearance duties. Rosemary continued to be used for mine clearance duties in August 1919, but by September that year, had been laid up.

In 1929, while part of the Fishery Protection and Minesweeping Flotilla, Rosemary spent four months carrying out survey operations near Rockall and between Iceland and the Faroe Islands, primarily in support of the fishing industry, and in particular to search for new fishing grounds. Rosemary continued these survey operations in June 1930. The Rosemary Bank, a seamount to the west of Scotland, was discovered by Rosemary during these surveys and was named after the sloop.

In February 1930, Rosemary was carrying out a fishery protection patrol off Murmansk when she was diverted to search for the trawler St. Louis, which had not been heard from since leaving Hull on 8 January bound for the fishing grounds off Bear Island. Rosemary met up with the sloop , and the two sloops searched deep into Arctic waters, to within  of the Arctic ice pack, the farthest North any Royal Navy ships had been for many years. They then continued the search down to Lerwick in the Shetland Islands. In September 1930, Rosemary, recently returned from patrols off Iceland, was ordered to reduce to reserve at Portsmouth. Rosemary was again part of the Fishery Protection and Minesweeping Flotilla, based at Portsmouth in August 1935. Rosemary was refitted in 1937, after which she was returned to the Reserve, being considered still useful in subsidiary roles in the event of a war.

Second World War
Rosemary returned to active service during the Second World War, recommissioning on 30 September 1939, and escorting convoys to France in the early months of the war. On 12 February 1940, Rosemary attacked a submarine contact near Start Point, with the sloop  and the destroyer  joining in the hunt for the submarine, which continued into the next day. In June 1940, Rosemary took part in Operation Aerial, the evacuation of Allied troops from ports in Western France, escorting evacuation shipping.

On 24 April 1943, two landing craft, LCG 15 and LCG 16, were on passage from Belfast to Falmouth, Cornwall, testing their seaworthiness, when they encountered a storm and heavy seas off the Pembrokeshire coast. They were denied permission to put into Fishguard and Milford Haven, but reached Freshwater Bay. After they began taking on water faster then the vessels' pumps could remove it, they radioed for help. The St Davids lifeboat did not arrive for over eight hours, when it was too dark to help. LCG 15 sank on 25 April, while Rosemary arrived on the scene later that day, launching a boat to try to rescue LCG 16s crew. This boat capsized, however, killing all six aboard, and on 26 April LCG 16 also sank, with all hands lost. In all, seventy-three died near Freshwater West from the two landing craft, along with the six men from Rosemary. A memorial to the seventy-nine that lost their lives was unveiled at Freshwater West on 25 April 2013.

Disposal
Rosemary was sold for demolition to the shipbreakers Thos. W. Ward on 17 December 1947 and scrapped at their Milford Haven works.

Notes

Citations

References
 
 
 
 
 
 
 
 
 
 
 

Arabis-class sloops
Ships built on the River Tees
1915 ships